Chengdu University of Technology is a station on Line 7 and Line 8 of the Chengdu Metro in China. It was opened on 6 December 2017. The station serves the nearby Chengdu University of Technology.

Station layout

Gallery

References

Railway stations in Sichuan
Railway stations in China opened in 2017
Chengdu Metro stations